Adamkus is a Lithuanian surname derived from a nickname, which is a diminutive of the given name Adam. Notable people with this surname include:
Valdas Adamkus, former Lithuanian president
Alma Adamkienė (born 1927)  Lithuanian-American philologist and philanthropist

Lithuanian-language surnames